Tugboat Records was a small independent record label based in London, England, which was affiliated with Rough Trade Records. It was founded in May 1998 by Geoff Travis, who had previously founded Rough Trade Records itself. The first release on Tugboat Records was "Joan of Arc", a 7" single by Low. The label's manager was Glen Johnson of Piano Magic. Among the most influential albums originally released by Tugboat was Any Other City (2001), the only studio album by Scottish indie rock band Life Without Buildings.

Notable artists
Notable artists who released one or more recordings on Tugboat Records include:
Life Without Buildings
Low
Sodastream
Spring Heel Jack
The Strokes
Vic Godard

References

Record labels established in 1998
Rough Trade Records
Record labels based in London
British independent record labels
Defunct record labels of the United Kingdom
Record labels disestablished in 2003
1998 establishments in England
2003 disestablishments in England
Indie rock record labels